In vascular diseases, endothelial dysfunction is a systemic pathological state of the endothelium. Along with acting as a semi-permeable membrane, the endothelium is responsible for maintaining vascular tone and regulating oxidative stress by releasing mediators, such as nitric oxide, prostacyclin and endothelin, and controlling local angiotensin-II activity.

Research

Atherosclerosis 
Endothelial dysfunction may be involved in the development of atherosclerosis and may predate vascular pathology. Endothelial dysfunction can also lead to increased adherence of monocytes and macrophages, as well as promoting infiltration of LDL in the vessel wall. Dyslipidemia and hypertension are well known to contribute to endothelial dysfunction, and lowering blood pressure and LDL has been shown to improve endothelial function, particularly when lowered with ACE inhibitors, calcium channel blockers, and statins.

Nitric oxide
Nitric oxide (NO) suppresses platelet aggregation, inflammation, oxidative stress, vascular smooth muscle cell migration and proliferation, and leukocyte adhesion. A feature of endothelial dysfunction is the inability of arteries and arterioles to dilate fully in response to an appropriate stimulus, such as exogenous nitroglycerine, that stimulates release of vasodilators from the endothelium like NO. Endothelial dysfunction is commonly associated with decreased NO bioavailability, which is due to impaired NO production by the endothelium or inactivation of NO by reactive oxygen species.

Testing and diagnosis 

In the coronary circulation, angiography of coronary artery responses to vasoactive agents may be used to test for endothelial function, and venous occlusion plethysmography and ultrasonography are used to assess endothelial function of peripheral vessels in humans.

A non-invasive method to measure endothelial dysfunction is % Flow-Mediated Dilation (FMD) as measured by Brachial Artery Ultrasound Imaging (BAUI). Current measurements of endothelial function via FMD vary due to technical and physiological factors. Furthermore, a negative correlation between percent flow mediated dilation and baseline artery size is recognised as a fundamental scaling problem, leading to biased estimates of endothelial function.

A non-invasive, FDA-approved device for measuring endothelial function that works by measuring Reactive Hyperemia Index (RHI) is Itamar Medical’s EndoPAT. It has shown an 80% sensitivity and 86% specificity to diagnose coronary artery disease when compared against the gold standard, acetylcholine angiogram. This results suggests that this peripheral test reflects the physiology of the coronary endothelium.

Since NO maintains low tone and high compliance of the small arteries at rest, a reduction of age-dependent small artery compliance is a marker for endothelial dysfunction that is associated with both functional and structural changes in the microcirculation. Small artery compliance or stiffness can be assessed simply and at rest and can be distinguished from large artery stiffness by use of pulsewave analysis.

Endothelial dysfunction and stents 
Stent implantation has been correlated with impaired endothelial function in several studies. Sirolimus eluting stents were previously used because they showed low rates of in-stent restenosis, but further investigation showed that they often impair endothelial function in humans and worsen conditions. One drug used to inhibit restenosis is iopromide-paclitaxel.

Risk reduction 
Treatment of hypertension and hypercholesterolemia may improve endothelial function in people taking statins (HMGCoA-reductase inhibitor), and renin angiotensin system inhibitors, such as ACE inhibitors and angiotensin II receptor antagonists. Calcium channel blockers and selective beta 1 antagonists may also improve endothelial dysfunction. Life style modifications such as smoking cessation have also been shown to improve endothelial function and lower the risk of major cardiovascular events.

See also 
 Atherosclerosis
 Endothelial activation
 Nitric oxide
 endothelial nitric oxide synthase
 Prostacyclin
 Endothelium-derived relaxing factor
 Endothelin
 Integrin network
 Endothelial shear stress

References 

Vascular diseases